Actinernidae is a family of sea anemones. It contains the following genera and species:

Actinernus Verrill, 1879
Actinernus elongatus (Hertwig, 1882)	 
Actinernus michaelsarsi Carlgren, 1918
Actinernus nobilis Verrill, 1879
Actinernus robustus (Hertwig, 1882)
Isactinernus Carlgren, 1918	
Isactinernus quadrilobatus Carlgren, 1918
Synactinernus Carlgren, 1918
Synactinernus flavus Carlgren, 1918
Synhalcurias Carlgren, 1914
Synhalcurias elegans (Wassilieff, 1908)

Notes

References

Cnidarian families
Actinernoidea